Muhammad Zahid Wakhshi (852-936 AH) was a Sufi of the Naqshbandī  Sufi order. He lived in Vakhsh (or Vakash), a small town in present-day Tajikistan, about 100 km South of the capital Dushanbe.
Naqshbandī  The Sufi order from Khwaja Ahrar transferred to him and he transferred to Darwish Muhammad. He was a close relative of Yaqub al-Charkhi, and according to some sources, he was his maternal grandson. His tomb is in Vakhsh.

References

Naqshbandi order
Sunni Sufis
Islamic philosophers
Hanafi fiqh scholars
Hanafis
Maturidis
Mujaddid
Hashemite people
Sufi saints